Minister for Development Cooperation of Denmark is a Danish minister office. The office was introduced with the Cabinet of Poul Nyrup Rasmussen I on 25 January 1993.

List of ministers

External links
Official website - from the Foreign Ministry of Denmark.

References
List of Danish governments - From the official website of Folketinget

Development Cooperation
Development Cooperation
Foreign relations of Denmark